Elachista oritropha is a moth of the family Elachistidae that is endemic to Uganda.

References

oritropha
Moths described in 1965
Moths of Africa
Endemic fauna of Uganda
Insects of Uganda